The Bethlehem Governorate is one of 16 Governorates of Palestine. It covers an area of the West Bank, south of Jerusalem. Its principal city and district capital is Bethlehem. According to the Palestinian Central Bureau of Statistics, its population was estimated to 199,463 in 2012.

Geography
According to United Nations Office for the Coordination of Humanitarian Affairs (OCHA), the governorate has a total area of around 660 km². Due to the occupation by Israel, Palestinians can only use 13% of the area and much of that is fragmented as of May 2009.

Politics
Politically, the Bethlehem Governorate is something of a stronghold of the Palestinian left. At the 2006 Palestinian legislative election the Popular Front for the Liberation of Palestine and The Alternative both had their best votes there. Its current governor is Salah al-Tamari.

Localities

The governorate consists of 10 municipalities, 3 refugee camps, and 58 rural districts.

Municipalities
Battir
Beit Fajjar
Beit Jala
Beit Sahour
Bethlehem
al-Dawha
Husan
al-Khader
Nahalin
Tuqu'
al-Ubeidiya
Za'atara

Local and village councils

'Arab al-Rashayida
Artas
al-Asakra
Beit Sakariya
Beit Ta'mir
Dar Salah
Hindaza
al 'Iqab
Jab'a

Juhdum
Jurat ash Sham'a
Kisan
Marah Rabah
Rakhme
Umm Salamuna
ash Shawawra
Wadi al-Arayis
Wadi Fukin
al-Walaja

Refugee camps
Aida
'Azza
Dheisheh

References

 
Governorates of the Palestinian National Authority in the West Bank